Out of Exile is the second studio album by American rock supergroup Audioslave, released on May 23, 2005, internationally, and a day later in the United States, through Epic Records and Interscope Records. It is the band's only album to chart at number one on the Billboard 200 chart. The album spawned the singles "Be Yourself", "Your Time Has Come", "Doesn't Remind Me", and "Out of Exile"; "Doesn't Remind Me" was nominated for Best Hard Rock Performance at the 48th Grammy Awards.

Background
In an interview shortly before the release of the album, drummer Brad Wilk said: "Audioslave the band has arrived. The first record was people from two other bands with history attached. I don't feel that with this record." For his part, Chris Cornell said he wrote his most personal songs ever for the album, influenced by positive changes in his life since 2002. He also described the album as more varied than the debut and relying less on heavy guitar riffs.

On May 4, 2005, the band traveled to Havana, Cuba, to spend some time interacting with Cuban musicians before playing a concert in the city on May 6. An audience of 70,000 attended the free show, and Audioslave became the first American rock group to perform in Cuba. At the time, Cornell said he hoped the concert would "help to open the musical borders between our two countries." The 26-song set made the concert the longest the band had ever played. Many songs from Out of Exile were performed live for the first time at the concert, which was held three weeks prior to the release of the album. Live in Cuba, a concert documentary covering the band's time in Cuba, was released on DVD in October 2005.

The songs "Your Time Has Come" and "Man or Animal" were featured in the 2006 racing video game FlatOut 2.

Reception

Critical

Critical response to the album was mostly warm, with many reviews highlighting the fact that the band was beginning to establish its own identity, as opposed to just being Rage Against the Machine fronted by Cornell, which is how some critics described the sound of their first album. Improvement was noted in the quality of Cornell's vocals, likely the result of him quitting smoking and drinking. Slant Magazine said Out of Exile had "the sound of a band coming into its own", and Allmusic praised the album as "lean, hard, strong, and memorable." 

The lyrics, however, were still a common complaint, with musicOMH.com writing that Cornell's lyrics "continue to border on the ridiculous." 

The album was chosen as one of Amazon.com's Top 100 Editor's Picks of 2005.

Commercial
Out of Exile was released in the United States on May 24, 2005. It sold 263,000 album-equivalent units in its first week of release, debuting at number one on the Billboard 200 chart. The album has been certified platinum by the Recording Industry Association of America, indicating sales of a  million units.

Track listing
All lyrics written by Chris Cornell; all music composed by Audioslave.

Note
The lyrics in the background during the bridge of "Drown Me Slowly" were reused as the lyrics of the bridge of "Sound of a Gun" on Audioslave's next album.

Personnel
Audioslave
 Chris Cornell – lead vocals
 Tom Morello – guitars
 Tim Commerford – bass
 Brad Wilk – drums

Production and design

 Produced by Rick Rubin and Audioslave
 Recorded by Brian Virtue, Thom Russo, and Jim Scott; Assisted by Jonny Polonsky, Jason Gossman, Dan Leffler, and Billy Mimes
 Album Production Coordinator/Wrangler: Lindsay Chase
 Mixed by Brendan O'Brien
 Additional Engineering by Billy Bowers
 Mastered by Stephen Marcussen
 Album Cover by Antony Nagelmann
 Art Direction by Robert Fisher
 Photography by Ethan Russell
 Pre-Production Engineering by Keith Simon

Chart positions

Weekly charts

Year-end charts

Singles

Certifications

See also 
 List of number-one albums of 2005 (Canada)
 List of number-one albums in 2005 (New Zealand)
 List of number-one albums of 2005 (U.S.)

References

External links

2005 albums
Audioslave albums
Epic Records albums
Interscope Records albums
Albums produced by Chris Cornell
Albums produced by Rick Rubin
Albums recorded at Sunset Sound Recorders
Albums recorded at The Mansion (recording studio)